This is a list of films which have placed number one at the weekly box office in France during 2001. Amounts are in French franc.

References

See also
 List of French films of 2001
 Lists of box office number-one films

2001
France
2001 in French cinema